Ernest Samuel Hamilton (April 17, 1883 – December 19, 1964) was a Canadian lacrosse player who competed in the 1908 Summer Olympics. He was part of the Canadian team which won the gold medal. He was the father of politician William McLean Hamilton.

On a club level Hamilton represented the Montreal Lacrosse Club.

Hamilton was also involved with ice hockey and in April of 1909 he was elected president of the Montreal Hockey Club of the Montreal Amateur Athletic Association.

References

External links
Olympic profile

1883 births
1964 deaths
Canadian lacrosse players
Olympic lacrosse players of Canada
Lacrosse players at the 1908 Summer Olympics
Olympic gold medalists for Canada
Medalists at the 1908 Summer Olympics
Olympic medalists in lacrosse